Lucio Pedercini (born September 22, 1972) is an Italian former professional Grand Prix motorcycle racer and current motorcycle racing team owner.

Career
Born in Volta Mantovana, he began racing in the Grand Prix world championships in 1992. He had his best season in 1996 when he finished in 17th place in the 500cc world championship final standings. Pedercini was Italian Superbike Champion in 2001 and 2002, riding a Ducati. He then competed in the World Superbike Championship from 1998 to 2006 with his best result being a 9th-place finish in the 2003 final standings.

Racing team ownership
After he retired from riding motorcycles, Pedercini became a motorcycle racing team owner competing as Team Pedercini in the FIM Superstock 1000 Cup with riders Vittorio Iannuzzo and Ayrton Badovini. In 2014, the team competed in the World Superbike Championship with riders Alessandro Andreozzi and Luca Scassa. They also fielded a team in the FIM Superstock 1000 Cup consisting of Lorenzo Savadori, Balazs Nemeth, Romain Lanusse and Javier Alviz. In 2015, the team were chosen by Kawasaki to be their satellite team competing in the World Superbike Championship with Javier Alviz and David Salom riding Kawasaki Ninja ZX-10R motorcycles.

Career statistics

Grand Prix motorcycle racing

Races by year
(key) (Races in bold indicate pole position) (Races in italics indicate fastest lap)

Superbike World Championship

Races by year
(key) (Races in bold indicate pole position) (Races in italics indicate fastest lap)

References

External links
 Team Pedercini web site

Living people
1972 births
Sportspeople from the Province of Mantua
Italian motorcycle racers
500cc World Championship riders
Superbike World Championship riders
Motorcycle racing team owners